Violeta Vuković (Serbian Cyrillic: Виолета Вуковић, born December 3, 1972, in Nova Varoš, SFR Yugoslavia) is a Serbian female basketball player. In career played in Vojvodina, Hemofarm, Pantere Basket, Szeviép-Szeged KE, BSE Budapest and Basket Spezia Club.

References

External links
Profile at eurobasket.com
Profile at fiba.com

1972 births
Living people
People from Nova Varoš
Serbian women's basketball players
Power forwards (basketball)
ŽKK Vojvodina players
ŽKK Vršac players